The Sayings of the Desert Fathers is the name given to various textual collections consisting of stories and sayings attributed to the Desert Fathers and Desert Mothers from approximately the 5th century AD.

The collections consist of wisdom stories describing the spiritual practices and experiences of early Christian hermits living in the desert of Egypt. They are typically in the form of a conversation between a younger monk and his spiritual father, or as advice given to visitors. Beginning as an oral tradition in the Coptic language, they were only later written down as Greek text. The stories were extremely popular among early Christian monks, and appeared in various forms and collections.

The original sayings were passed down from monk to monk, though in their current version most simply describe the stories in the form of "Abba X said...." The early Desert Fathers and Desert Mothers also received many visitors seeking counseling, typically by asking "Give me a word, abba" or "Speak a word, amma, how can I be saved?" Some of the sayings are responses to those seeking guidance.

Many notable Desert Fathers are mentioned in the collections, including Anthony the Great, Abba Arsenius, Abba Poemen, Abba Macarius of Egypt, and Abba Moses the Black. The sayings also include those of three different ammas, or Desert Mothers, most notably Syncletica of Alexandria. Sayings of the Desert Fathers influenced many notable theologians, including Saint Jerome and Saint Augustine.

History of the text
The Desert Fathers spoke Coptic, a language related to ancient Egyptian. The sayings were originally passed on orally in Coptic, but the original written version was Greek. The earliest written record of the sayings appears to be from the end of the 4th century AD. Two versions from the 5th century, the Collectio Monastica, written in Ethiopic, and the Asceticon of Isaiah of Scetis, written in Greek, show how the oral tradition became the written collections. There are surviving fragments of the Sayings in both the Sahidic and Bohairic dialects of Coptic, but they represent back-translations from Greek. They were collected and published by Marius Chaîne.

The Sayings have been translated in whole or in part several times. Pelagius and John the Deacon made the first translations into Latin. Martin of Braga also translated some of the Sayings into Latin, followed by a more extensive translation by Paschasius of Dumium in approximately 555. That work may contain only one fifth of the original Greek text. In the 17th century, the Dutch Jesuit Heribert Rosweyde compiled and translated all the available sources on the Desert Fathers and published them in Latin as the Vitae patrum.

Two translations in Aramaic were made: the Nestorian monk Ânân Îshô's translation into Classical Syriac from the early 7th century, known as the Paradise of the Fathers; and a Christian Palestinian Aramaic translation known only from fragments published by Hugo Duensing. There are also Armenian translations of both the Alphabetical and Systematic collections. In the period 867–872, Methodius of Thessaloniki translated the text into Old Church Slavonic, of which the original was lost in the 14th century, but several dozen copies of the Paterik''' (Патерікъ) survived. Some of the Sayings are preserved in Arabic and Georgian translations. Through the Asceticon, some of the Sayings made their way into Sogdian.

Helen Waddell translated a selection of elements from the Vitae patrum into English in the early 20th century. The first complete translation of the "apophthegmata" into English is that of Benedicta Ward (1975).

Examples
Abba Theophilus, the archbishop, came to Scetis one day. The brethren who were assembled said to Abba Pambo, 'Say something to the Archbishop, so that he may be edified.' The old man said to them, 'If he is not edified by my silence, he will not be edified by my speech.'
Abbot Pastor said: If a man has done wrong and does not deny it, but says: I did wrong, do not rebuke him, because you will break the resolution of his soul. And if you tell him: Do not be sad, brother, but watch it in the future, you stir him up to change his life.
A hermit saw someone laughing, and said to him, "We have to render an account of our whole life before heaven and earth, and you can laugh?"
Abba Longinus said to Abba Acacius: 'A woman knows she has conceived when she no longer loses any blood. So it is with the soul, she knows she has conceived the Holy Spirit when the passions stop coming out of her. But as long as one is held back in the passions, how can one dare to believe one is sinless? Give blood and receive the Spirit.'

Collections
Different Sayings collections include the Alphabetic Sayings, the Systematic Sayings, and the Anonymous Sayings.

Anonymous Sayings
The sections of the Anonymous Sayings (Wortley 2013) are:

Alphabetical Sayings
The Alphabetical Sayings (Ward 1984) list the sayings of 131 Desert Fathers and Desert Mothers. Although some of the Desert Fathers quoted in the collection are well known, other names are obscure and difficult to identify.

Systematic Sayings
The 20 chapters of the Systematic Sayings (Wortley 2012) are:

Versions
There are four major versions of the Systematic Collection, in Greek, Latin, Syriac, and Armenian. The contents of each are:

See also
 Asceticon Ethiopic Collectio Monastica Ethics of the Fathers Gospel of Thomas
 Kōan
 Lausiac History Vitae Patrum Wisdom literature

Notes

Further reading

Nomura, Yushi. Desert Wisdom: Sayings from the Desert Fathers. Maryknoll, N.Y.: Orbis Books, 2001.
Regnault, Lucien. Les chemins de Dieu au désert: collection systematique des Apophtegmes des Pères. Solesmes: Éditions de Solesmes, 1992. (complete French translation of the Greek Systematic Collection)
Dion, J. and G. Oury. Les Sentences des Pères du Désert: recueil de Pélage et Jean. Solesmes: Abbaye Saint-Pierre, 1966. (complete French translation of the Latin Systematic Collection (Verba Seniorum of Pelagius and John))
Chaîne M. (ed). Le manuscrit de la version copte en dialect sahidique des "Apophthegmata Patrum". Bibliothèque d'études coptes 6. Cairo: Institut Français d'Archéologie Orientale, 1960. (Sahidic Coptic text)
Regnault, Lucien. Les Sentences des Pères du Désert: troisième recueil et tables. Sablé-sur-Sarthe: Solesmes, 1976. (French translation of the Bohairic Coptic version in p. 139–194, and of the Armenian version in p. 253–275)
Budge, E. A. Wallis. The Sayings and Stories of the Christian Fathers of Egypt: The Syrian Version of the "Apophthegmata Patrum" (2 vol.). Reprint of 1934 ed. London: Kegan Paul Limited, 2002. (English translation of the Syriac Collection)

Leloir, Louis (ed). Paterica armeniaca a P. P. Mechitaristis edita (1855) nunc latine reddita''. CSCO 353, 361, 371, 379. Louvain: Secrétariat du Corpus SCO, 1974–1976. (Armenian text)

External links

Desert Fathers apophthegm quotations at OrthodoxWiki
A bibliography of the various collections of the Sayings of the Desert Fathers

Church Fathers
Wisdom literature
Egyptian hermits
Anthony the Great
Books of quotations
Hesychast literature